KSRA (960 AM) is a radio station broadcasting an adult contemporary music format. Licensed to Salmon, Idaho, United States, the station is currently owned by Emily and Robert Goodrich, through licensee Bitterroot Communications, Inc. It features programming from Cumulus Media Networks.

Studios for KSRA AM-FM are located at 315 Riverfront in Salmon. Both transmitters are at the joint transmitter site, northeast of town, off North St. Charles Road.

History
KSRA signed on in 1959 and was owned by David and Elizabeth Ainsworth. They sold the station in 1969. James and Cindy Hone purchased the station in 2000 from Wescomm, Inc. The station's FM sister station, KSRA-FM, signed on in 1979. The Hones' Salmon River Communications sold both stations to Bitterroot Communications, Inc. effective January 4, 2019 for $350,000.

References

External links
FCC History Cards for KSRA
KSRA official website

SRA (AM)
Mainstream adult contemporary radio stations in the United States
Radio stations established in 1959